Riverside was a store brand used by North American retailer Montgomery Ward to market a range of captive import motorcycles, mopeds and scooters. The vehicles were typically manufactured by Motobecane, Benelli, Bianchi, Lambretta, or Mitsubishi. Benelli models included 250cc, 125cc, and 49cc models, Motobecanes with 49cc motors were also offered.

Benelli models 
 150-D (2-cycle 49cc)
 FFA-14002 (2-cycle 49cc)
 FFA-14003 (2-cycle 49cc)
 FFA-14017, 14017C, 14017D, 14023 (4-cycle 247cc)
 FFA-14020 (4-cycle 326.8cc)
 FFA-14040, 14041 (4-cycle 356.3cc)
 FFA-14043, 14047 (4-cycle 269.2cc)
 FFA-61-14016, 14016B, 14019 (2-cycle 125cc)
 FFA-61-14021A (2-cycle 175cc)

Lambretta models 
 125Li (2-cycle 125cc)

Mitsubishi models 
  Miami (2-cycle 200cc)

Motobecane models 
  Mo-Ped (2-cycle 49cc)

Bianchi models 
 Orsetto (2-cycle 80cc)

References 

Motorcycles by brand
Motor scooters
Mopeds
Mitsubishi Motors motorcycles
Benelli motorcycles
American brands